Sweet Sundown is the third studio album by Canadian country music artist Jason Blaine. It was released on March 30, 2010, by E1 Entertainment. Blaine wrote or co-wrote ten of the album's eleven tracks, including "Home Is a Highway," a collaboration with Steve Wariner. "When You Love Someone" was previously recorded by Bryan Adams on his 1997 album MTV Unplugged.

Track listing

Chart performance

Singles

References

2010 albums
Jason Blaine albums
E1 Music albums